Shaydyrova is a rural locality (a village) in Leninskoye Rural Settlement, Kudymkarsky District, Perm Krai, Russia. The population was 22 as of 2010.

Geography 
Shaydyrova is located 20 km south of Kudymkar (the district's administrative centre) by road. Spasova is the nearest rural locality.

References 

Rural localities in Kudymkarsky District